Xu Yanmei (Chinese: 许艳梅; born February 1971) is a female Chinese diver. Xu was awarded the "Best Sportsperson since the founding of the People's Republic of China" in 1989.

She retired in 1991, and is married. She studied at Hainan University, and currently serves in Hainan government.

Major performances
1985 World Age Group Championships - 1st springboard (Group B)
1987 Holland World Cup - 1st team
1987 National Games - 1st platform
1988 Seoul Olympic Games - 1st platform
1989 Beijing World Cup - 1st team & mixed team
1990 Asian Games - 1st platform

See also
 List of members of the International Swimming Hall of Fame

References
Profile - China Daily

1971 births
Living people
Chinese female divers
Olympic gold medalists for China
Olympic medalists in diving
Asian Games medalists in diving
Sportspeople from Jiangxi
People from Ganzhou
Divers at the 1990 Asian Games
Divers at the 1986 Asian Games
Medalists at the 1988 Summer Olympics
Asian Games gold medalists for China
Asian Games silver medalists for China
Medalists at the 1986 Asian Games
Medalists at the 1990 Asian Games
Divers at the 1988 Summer Olympics
20th-century Chinese women